Sathya Hettige PC is a Sri Lankan judge and lawyer. He was a sitting judge of the Supreme Court of Sri Lanka and is also a non-resident Justice of Appeal of the Supreme Court of Fiji. Prior to his appointment as Puisne Justice of the Supreme Court of Sri Lanka he was serving as president of Court of appeal.

Hettige secured his LLB Degree from the University of Colombo. He qualified as an Attorney-at-Law in 1976 joining the Attorney General's department in 1978. Hettige served as Principal Law Officer in the Director of Public Prosecutions, Fiji Islands and was enrolled as a Barrister and Solicitor in the Supreme Court of Fiji on 19 March 1993.

He is related to the Rajapaksa family.

References

Puisne Justices of the Supreme Court of Sri Lanka
Sinhalese judges
20th-century Sri Lankan people
21st-century Sri Lankan people
Alumni of the University of Colombo
Sri Lankan judges on the courts of Fiji
Supreme Court of Fiji justices
Living people
Presidents of the Court of Appeal of Sri Lanka
Year of birth missing (living people)